Everclear is the fifth studio album by American indie rock band American Music Club. It was released on October 5, 1991, on Alias Records.

"Rise" was released as a single in 1991 via the Rise CD maxi-EP on Alias Records, which contained the non-album tracks "Chanel #5", "The Right Thing" and an alternate version of "Crabwalk". The music video for "Rise" received minor play on MTV's 120 Minutes late-night program.

Critical reception

On the strength of Everclear, Mark Eitzel was named Rolling Stone magazine's Songwriter of the Year in 1991. Rolling Stone also placed Everclear in their list of top five albums of the year.

In an article in the December 1994 – January 1995 issue of Addicted to Noise, the band recounted:

Track listing

Personnel

American Music Club
Mark Eitzel – vocals, guitar, keyboards, songwriting
Bruce Kaphan – pedal steel, keyboards, bass, percussion, lap steel, dobro, guitar, dulcimer
Dan Pearson – bass, guitar, dulcimer, mandolin, banjo, vocals
Mike Simms – drums
Vudi – guitar, accordion, bass

Production
American Music Club – production
Tom Carr – recording
Joe Chiccarelli – mixing
Kyle Johnson – second engineer at Soma Sync Studios
Bruce Kaphan – production, mixing, recording
Norman Kerner – production, recording
Bob Ludwig – mastering
Artwork and design
Beth Herzhaft – photography
Jean Lowe – cover painting
Frank Weidemann – design

Production notes
All songs produced by Bruce Kaphan and American Music Club except "Rise" and "The Dead Part of You", produced by Norman Kerner and American Music Club.
All songs mixed by Joe Chiccarelli except "The Confidential Agent" and "What the Pillar of Salt Held Up", mixed by Bruce Kaphan.
All songs recorded by Bruce Kaphan and Tom Carr at Music Annex Studio A (Menlo Park, California) and at Soma Sync Studios (San Francisco), except "Rise" and "The Dead Part of You", recorded by Norman Kerner at Brilliant Studios (San Francisco) and Bruce Kaphan and Tom Carr at Soma Sync Studios.
All songs mastered by Bob Ludwig at Masterdisk in New York.

References

External links
 1994 Addicted to Noise article on American Music Club
 [ AllMusic analysis of song "Sick of Food"]

1991 albums
American Music Club albums
Alias Records albums